Infiltrator or variations thereof may refer to:

 In military combat, someone who practices infiltration tactics
 In espionage, a double agent joining an enemy organization

Books
 The Infiltrators, a spy novel in the Matt Helm series
 Infiltrator, the first novel in the T2 (novel series) trilogy
 Infiltrator, a novel in the Worlds of Power series, a novelization of the video game

Film and TV
 The Infiltrator (1995 film), a 1995 TV movie starring Oliver Platt
 The Infiltrator (2016 film), a 2016 crime drama film
 "Infiltrator" (Young Justice), a first season episode of the American animated TV show Young Justice

Games
 Infiltrator (video game), a game released in 1986
 Medal of Honor: Infiltrator, a third-person shooter video game

See also
 Infiltration (disambiguation)